1-Chloronaphthalene is an aromatic compound. It is a colorless, oily liquid which may be used to determine the refractive index of crystals by immersion. The compound is an isomer to 2-chloronaphthalene.

Synthesis
1-Chloronaphthalene is obtained directly by chlorination of naphthalene, with the formation of more highly substituted derivatives such as dichloro- and trichloronaphthalenes in addition to the two monochlorinated isomeric compounds: 1-chloronaphthalene and 2-chloronaphthalene.

Applications
This toxic, nonpolar organochlorine compound is sometimes used as a powerful biocide, and is also known as Basileum.  It occasionally serves as insecticide and fungicide in the timber floors of shipping containers, where it fulfills the same role as chlordane.

1-Chloronaphthalene was also used as a common solvent for oils, fats and DDT until the 1970s. It is also used to determine the refractive index of crystals.

See also
1-Fluoronaphthalene
1-Bromonaphthalene

References

Chloroarenes
1-Naphthyl compounds